Calandrinia breweri is a species of flowering plant in the family Montiaceae known by the common name Brewer's redmaids.

It is native to the coastal mountains and canyons of California and Baja California, where it grows in several types of habitat, including recently burned and otherwise disturbed areas.

Description
Calandrinia breweri is an annual herb producing thick, hairless stems up to 45 centimeters long which may grow upright or sprawl along the ground. The thick leaves are oval to spoon-shaped and up to 8 centimeters long. Flowers bloom March to May.

The inflorescence is a raceme of bright red to pink flowers, each on a long pedicel. Each flower has generally five petals which are under half a centimeter long.

The fruit is a capsule containing 10 to 15 seeds which are finely bumpy under magnification.

References

External links

Jepson Manual Treatment of Calandrinia breweri
Flora of North America
Calandrinia breweri — U.C. Photo gallery

breweri
Flora of California
Flora of Baja California
Flora of the Sierra Nevada (United States)
Natural history of the California chaparral and woodlands
Natural history of the California Coast Ranges
Natural history of the San Francisco Bay Area
Natural history of the Santa Monica Mountains
Natural history of the Transverse Ranges